The 2020 United States presidential election in Iowa was held on Tuesday, November 3, 2020, as part of the 2020 United States presidential election in which all 50 states plus the District of Columbia participated. Iowa voters chose electors to represent them in the Electoral College via a popular vote, pitting the Republican Party's nominee, incumbent President Donald Trump of Florida, and running mate Vice President Mike Pence of Indiana against Democratic Party nominee, former Vice President Joe Biden of Delaware, and his running mate California Senator Kamala Harris. Iowa has six electoral votes in the Electoral College.

Trump won the state 53.1% to 44.9%. Prior to this election, most news organizations had considered Iowa as either leaning towards Trump or a tossup. As was the case in Ohio, this election has confirmed Iowa's trend from a Midwestern swing state toward the GOP column, the same trend as neighboring Missouri starting in 2008. Iowa had voted Democratic in six of seven elections prior to 2016, with the exception being George W. Bush's narrow plurality win in 2004. In 2016, however, Iowa voted for Trump by an unexpectedly large margin of 9.4%, voting over ten points to the right of the nation overall, indicating a possible realignment of the previously Democratic-leaning state towards the GOP, much as in the case of West Virginia in 2000 and 2004. Even though Biden contested the state, Trump ended up carrying it by only a slightly reduced margin of 8.2% even as his national margin of defeat grew by 2.4%, meaning that the state voted even further to the right of the national average than it did in 2016.

Biden became the first Democratic nominee since Jimmy Carter in 1976 to win the presidency without carrying Iowa, the first since 1916 to win without carrying Wapello County, as well as the first since FDR in 1940 to win the presidency without carrying Dubuque County and Howard County. Biden improved on Hillary Clinton's margins in the Des Moines and Cedar Rapids metropolitan areas and traditionally conservative western Iowa, the latter of which borders Nebraska's 2nd congressional district (Omaha urban area), an electoral vote Trump won in 2016 but lost in 2020. Trump improved on his 2016 performance in populist northeast and south Iowa and became the first Republican to win Iowa in back to back elections since Ronald Reagan in 1980 and 1984.

Iowa is one of three states that voted twice for Barack Obama and Trump, the other two being Ohio and Florida. This was the first time since 2000 that Iowa backed the losing candidate in a presidential election, and the first since 1988 that it voted for the loser of both the popular and electoral vote. It is also the first time since 2004 that Iowa voted for a different candidate than neighboring Wisconsin.

Trump became the first Republican candidate as well as the second ever incumbent president to carry Iowa and lose the presidency since Gerald Ford in 1976 as well as the only presidential incumbent to carry the state twice and lose re-election since Benjamin Harrison.

Caucuses
The state's caucuses, traditionally the first major electoral event in the country, were held on February 3, 2020.

Republican caucuses

Incumbent president Donald Trump received about 97 percent of the votes in the Republican caucuses, and received 39 of the GOP delegates, while Bill Weld received enough votes to clinch 1 delegate.

Democratic caucuses

After a three-day delay in votes being reported, the Iowa Democratic Party declared that Pete Buttigieg had narrowly won the state delegate equivalent (SDE) count of the Democratic caucuses with 26.2 percent. Bernie Sanders came in second with 26.1 percent of the SDEs, despite the fact that he received more popular votes (26.5 percent) than Buttigieg (25.1 percent). Elizabeth Warren, Joe Biden, and Amy Klobuchar finished in third, fourth, and fifth place, respectively.

Libertarian caucuses

The Libertarian Party of Iowa conducted their own caucuses on February 8, offering in-person caucus locations and an online virtual caucus. Only registered Libertarian voters were eligible to participate.

General election

Final predictions

Polling
Graphical summary

Aggregate polls

Polls

Donald Trump vs. Michael Bloomberg

Donald Trump vs. Cory Booker

Donald Trump vs. Pete Buttigieg

Donald Trump vs. Kirsten Gillibrand

Donald Trump vs. Kamala Harris

Donald Trump vs. Amy Klobuchar

Donald Trump vs. Beto O'Rourke

Donald Trump vs. Bernie Sanders

Donald Trump vs. Elizabeth Warren

with Donald Trump and Sherrod Brown

with Donald Trump and Nancy Pelosi

with Donald Trump, Bernie Sanders, and Howard Schultz

with Donald Trump, Elizabeth Warren, and Howard Schultz

with Donald Trump and generic Democrat

Results

Results by county

Results by congressional district
Trump won all 4 of the state's congressional districts, including one that elected a Democrat.

Analysis
Per exit polling by the Associated Press, Trump's strength in Iowa came from White Iowans with no college degree, who comprised 62% of the electorate and supported Trump by 58%–40%. Trump also dominated amongst Christian voters, garnering 66% of Protestants, 54% of Catholics, and 76% of born-again/Evangelical Christians. 53% of voters believed Trump was better able to handle international trade. Trump continued to win the cultural message among voters without college degrees in the Hawkeye State.

During the primary season, there remained hope among Democrats that Iowa would still be a contestable state. However, Trump's well-held victory in the state in the general election also saw Republican congressional candidates—from Senator Joni Ernst to two House seats, both held by Democrats (one vacated by Dave Loebsack in Iowa's 2nd district)—winning their election.

Neither Biden nor Trump flipped any counties in the state, although Biden came within 2% of flipping Dallas County, a suburb of Des Moines. Jefferson County was also very close, having gone for Trump by a similarly tight margin four years earlier.

See also
 United States presidential elections in Iowa
 2020 Iowa elections
 2020 United States presidential election
 2020 Democratic Party presidential primaries
 2020 Republican Party presidential primaries
 2020 United States elections

Notes

Partisan clients

References

Further reading
 
 . (Describes bellwether Marshall County, Iowa)

External links
  (state affiliate of the U.S. League of Women Voters)
 
 

Presidential
Iowa
2020